Thomas Butler (28 April 1918 – 11 September 2009) was an English retired professional footballer who played as a right winger in the Football League.

References

External links
 

1918 births
2009 deaths
People from Atherton, Greater Manchester
English footballers
Bolton Wanderers F.C. players
Accrington Stanley F.C. (1891) players
Oldham Athletic A.F.C. players
Macclesfield Town F.C. players
Middlesbrough F.C. players
Wigan Athletic F.C. players
English Football League players
Association football wingers